The Boca Express Train Museum, operated by the Boca Raton Historical Society, is housed in a restored 1930 Florida East Coast Railway (FEC) train station in Boca Raton, Florida. designed by Chester G. Henninger, built for Clarence H. Geist. It is located at 747 South Dixie Highway, off U.S. 1 (Federal Highway). On October 24, 1980, it was added to the U.S. National Register of Historic Places.

That the building was restored and turned into a museum must be credited to the philanthropist Countess de Hoernle, who bought the abandoned building as a present for her husband.

Use as a passenger train station

Historically, the station served several long-distance trains and one or two local trains. Into the early 1960s, passengers could take one of two Chicago-bound trains (on alternating days), the City of Miami or the South Wind (both via Birmingham) and the New York City-bound East Coast Champion, Havana Special, and Miamian from the FEC's station. Into the latter 1950s, passengers could take the Dixie Flagler to Chicago via Atlanta from the station. The FEC operated local passenger service between Jacksonville and the Miami area until July 31, 1968.

However, Brightline shut down operations during the 2020–2021 Covid pandemic.

Exhibits
The Museum contains two restored and unique 1947 Seaboard Air Line streamlined rail cars, a dining and a lounge car, built by the Budd Company and listed on the National Register of Historic Places. The Boca Express Train Museum also includes a 1946 Atlantic Coast Line caboose and a 1930 Baldwin steam switch engine.

For sale
The Boca Raton Historical Society put the Train Museum up for sale in 2017, saying that maintaining two historic buildings (the other is the Society's home, Boca Raton's first city hall) is draining the nonprofit's resources.

See also
 Seaboard Air Line 6113
 Seaboard Air Line 6603
 South Florida Railway Museum

References

External links
 
 Boca Express Train Museum - Boca Raton Historical Society

Boca Raton
Railway stations on the National Register of Historic Places in Florida
Buildings and structures in Boca Raton, Florida
Former railway stations in Florida
National Register of Historic Places in Palm Beach County, Florida
Museums in Palm Beach County, Florida
Railroad museums in Florida
Transportation buildings and structures in Palm Beach County, Florida
Florida East Coast Railway
Preserved steam locomotives of the United States
1930 establishments in Florida
Seaboard Air Line Railroad
Atlantic Coast Line Railroad
Budd Company
Railway stations in the United States opened in 1930